Glenea manto is a species of beetle in the family Cerambycidae. It was described by Francis Polkinghorne Pascoe in 1866. It is known from Malaysia, Sumatra, Borneo and Java.

References

manto
Beetles described in 1866